Jules Goux (6 April 1885 - 6 March 1965) was a French racing driver and Grand Prix motor racing champion. He was also notable for being the first Frenchman, and the first European driver, to win the Indianapolis 500.

Biography
Influenced by the Gordon Bennett Cup in auto racing, Jules Goux began racing cars in his early twenties. Success came in 1909 on a circuit set up on roads around Sitges, near Barcelona, Spain, when he won the Catalan Cup, a victory he repeated the following year. Because of his racing success, along with Georges Boillot, he was invited by Peugeot Automobile to race for their factory team. As part of a four-man design team led by Paul Zuccarelli and Ernest Henry, Goux helped develop a racecar powered by a radically new Straight-4 engine using a twin overhead cam.

Jules Goux won the 1912 Sarthe Cup at Le Mans driving a Peugeot, and in 1913 he travelled with the team to the United States to compete in the Indianapolis 500 race. Goux won the race, becoming the first non-American Indy 500 winner in history. Goux reportedly consumed four bottles of champagne while driving in the Indy 500 (then known as the International 500-Mile Sweepstakes Race) and was later quoted as saying, "Without the good wine, I would have not been able to win."

The following year, World War I broke out in Europe and his racing career had to be put aside for service in the French military. At war's end, Goux returned to European Grand Prix motor racing. In 1921, driving for Ballot Automobile, he finished third in the French Grand Prix then won the inaugural Italian Grand Prix at Brescia, Italy. For the next few years his racing career was marked by repeated problems and he did not return to the winners circle until 1926. That year, driving for Bugatti in a T39A model, he won both the French Grand Prix at Miramas and the European Grand Prix at the Circuito Lasarte, Spain.

Indianapolis 500 results

References
 

1885 births
1965 deaths
People from Valentigney
French racing drivers
Grand Prix drivers
Indianapolis 500 drivers
Indianapolis 500 winners
French military personnel of World War I
Sportspeople from Doubs